The 2020–21 Portland Trail Blazers season was the franchise's 51st season in the National Basketball Association (NBA). The Trail Blazers entered the season following a playoff defeat from the Los Angeles Lakers in the first round of the play-in tournament. After the Toronto Raptors and Houston Rockets failed to qualify for the postseason for the first time since the 2012-13 and 2011-12 season respectively, the Trail Blazers now hold the longest active playoff streak in the NBA qualifying every year since the 2013-14 season. In the first round, the Trail Blazers faced the Denver Nuggets where they lost to them in six games.

Following the playoff exit, the Trail Blazers and head coach Terry Stotts mutually agreed to part ways after nine years.

Draft picks

Roster

Standings

Division

Conference

Notes
 z – Clinched home court advantage for the entire playoffs
 c – Clinched home court advantage for the conference playoffs
 y – Clinched division title
 x – Clinched playoff spot
 pb – Clinched play-in spot
 o – Eliminated from playoff contention
 * – Division leader

Game log

Preseason

|-style="background:#cfc;"
| 1
| December 11
| Sacramento
| 
| Carmelo Anthony (21)
| Harry Giles (14)
| Lillard, McColllum (5)
| Moda Center0
| 1–0
|-style="background:#fcc;"
| 2
| December 13
| Sacramento
| 
| Harry Giles (19)
| Harry Giles (13)
| Rodney Hood (4)
| Moda Center0
| 1–1
|-style="background:#fcc;"
| 3
| December 16
| @ Denver
| 
| Robert Covington (15)
| Jusuf Nurkic (8)
| Damian Lillard (4)
| Ball Arena0
| 1–2
|-style="background:#fcc;"
| 4
| December 18
| @ Denver
| 
| CJ McCollum (26)
| Enes Kanter (9)
| Jusuf Nurkic (4)
| Ball Arena0
| | 1–3

Regular season

|- style="background:#fcc
| 1
| December 23
| Utah
| 
| CJ McCollum (23)
| Enes Kanter (8)
| Damian Lillard (7)
| Moda Center0
| 0–1
|- style="background:#cfc
| 2
| December 26
| Houston
| 
| CJ McCollum (44)
| Jusuf Nurkic (11)
| Damian Lillard (9)
| Moda Center0
| 1–1
|- style="background:#cfc
| 3
| December 28
| @ L. A. Lakers
| 
| Damian Lillard (31)
| Enes Kanter (14)
| CJ McCollum (11)
| Staples Center0
| 2–1
|- style="background:#fcc
| 4
| December 30
| @ L. A. Clippers
| 
| CJ McCollum (25)
| Enes Kanter (10)
| Damian Lillard (4)
| Staples Center0
| 2–2

|- style="background:#cfc
| 5
| January 1
| @ Golden State
| 
| Damian Lillard (34)
| Robert Covington (11)
| Damian Lillard (8)
| Chase Center0
| 3–2
|- style="background:#fcc
| 6
| January 3
| @ Golden State
| 
| Damian Lillard (32)
| Enes Kanter (12)
| CJ McCollum (5)
| Chase Center0
| 3–3
|- style="background:#fcc
| 7
| January 5
| Chicago
| 
| CJ McCollum (26)
| Jusuf Nurkic (11)
| Damian Lillard (9)
| Moda Center0
| 3–4
|- style="background:#cfc
| 8
| January 7
| Minnesota
| 
| Damian Lillard (39)
| Kanter, Lillard, Nurkic  (7)
| Damian Lillard (7)
| Moda Center0
| 4–4
|- style="background:#cfc
| 9
| January 9
| @ Sacramento
| 
| CJ McCollum (37)
| Enes Kanter (15)
| Damian Lillard (6)
| Golden 1 Center0
| 5–4
|- style="background:#cfc
| 10
| January 11
| Toronto
| 
| CJ McCollum (30)
| Robert Covington (8)
| Lillard, McCollum (5)
| Moda Center0
| 6–4
|- style="background:#cfc
| 11
| January 13
| @ Sacramento
| 
| Damian Lillard (40)
| Jusuf Nurkic (13)
| Damian Lillard (13)
| Golden 1 Center0
| 7–4
|- style="background:#fcc
| 12
| January 14
| Indiana
| 
| Lillard, McCollum (22)
| Enes Kanter (9)
| Lillard, McCollum (4)
| Moda Center0
| 7–5
|- style="background:#cfc
| 13
| January 16
| Atlanta
| 
| Damian Lillard (36)
| Enes Kanter (15)
| Damian Lillard (7)
| Moda Center0
| 8–5
|- style="background:#fcc
| 14
| January 18
| San Antonio
| 
| Damian Lillard (35)
| Enes Kanter (8)
| Damian Lillard (6)
| Moda Center0
| 8–6
|-style="background:#ccc;"
| –
| January 20
| Memphis
| colspan="6" | Postponed (COVID-19) (Makeup date: April 23)
|-style="background:#ccc;"
| –
| January 22
| Memphis
| colspan="6" | Postponed (COVID-19) (Makeup date: April 25)
|- style="background:#cfc
| 15
| January 24
| New York
| 
| Damian Lillard (39)
| Kanter, Giles (8)
| Damian Lillard (8)
| Moda Center0
| 9–6
|- style="background:#fcc
| 16
| January 25
| Oklahoma City
| 
| Lillard, Simons (26)
| Enes Kanter (22)
| Damian Lillard (10)
| Moda Center0
| 9–7
|- style="background:#fcc
| 17
| January 28
| @ Houston
| 
| Damian Lillard (30)
| Enes Kanter (13)
| Damian Lillard (9)
| Toyota Center3,154
| 9–8
|- style="background:#cfc
| 18
| January 30
| @ Chicago
| 
| Damian Lillard (44)
| Enes Kanter (11)
| Damian Lillard (9)
| United Center0
| 10–8

|- style="background:#fcc
| 19
| February 1
| @ Milwaukee
| 
| Nassir Little (30)
| Enes Kanter (11)
| Damian Lillard (7)
| Fiserv Forum0
| 10–9
|- style="background:#cfc
| 20
| February 2
| @ Washington
| 
| Damian Lillard (32)
| Enes Kanter (15)
| Damian Lillard (8)
| Capital One Arena0
| 11–9
|- style="background:#cfc
| 21
| February 4
| @ Philadelphia
| 
| Gary Trent Jr. (24)
| Enes Kanter (18)
| Carmelo Anthony (5)
| Wells Fargo Center0
| 12–9
|- style="background:#fcc
| 22
| February 6
| @ New York
| 
| Damian Lillard (29)
| Enes Kanter (11)
| Damian Lillard (9)
| Madison Square Garden0
| 12–10
|- style="background:#cfc
| 23
| February 9
| Orlando
| 
| Damian Lillard (36)
| Robert Covington (11)
| Gary Trent Jr. (6)
| Moda Center0
| 13–10
|- style="background:#cfc
| 24
| February 11
| Philadelphia
| 
| Damian Lillard (30)
| Enes Kanter (14)
| Damian Lillard (7)
| Moda Center0
| 14–10
|- style="background:#cfc
| 25
| February 12
| Cleveland
| 
| Gary Trent Jr. (26)
| Enes Kanter (13)
| Damian Lillard (9)
| Moda Center0
| 15–10
|- style="background:#cfc
| 26
| February 14
| @ Dallas
| 
| Damian Lillard (34)
| Enes Kanter (8)
| Damian Lillard (11)
| American Airlines Center2,211
| 16–10
|- style="background:#cfc
| 27
| February 16
| @ Oklahoma City
| 
| Damian Lillard (31)
| Enes Kanter (21)
| Damian Lillard (10)
| Chesapeake Energy Arena0
| 17–10
|- style="background:#cfc
| 28
| February 17
| @ New Orleans
| 
| Damian Lillard (43)
| Robert Covington (8)
| Damian Lillard (16)
| Smoothie King Center1,940
| 18–10
|- style="background:#fcc
| 29
| February 20
| Washington
| 
| Damian Lillard (35)
| Enes Kanter (13)
| Damian Lillard (12)
| Moda Center0
| 18–11
|- style="background:#fcc
| 30
| February 22
| @ Phoenix
| 
| Damian Lillard (24)
| Enes Kanter (15)
| Damian Lillard (7)
| Phoenix Suns Arena3,213
| 18–12
|- style="background:#fcc
| 31
| February 23
| @ Denver
| 
| Damian Lillard (25)
| Enes Kanter (14)
| Damian Lillard (13)
| Ball Arena0
| 18–13
|- style="background:#fcc
| 32
| February 26
| @ L. A. Lakers
| 
| Damian Lillard (35)
| Enes Kanter (17)
| Damian Lillard (7)
| Staples Center0
| 18–14

|- style="background:#cfc
| 33
| March 1
| Charlotte
| 
| Carmelo Anthony (29)
| Enes Kanter (11)
| Damian Lillard (10)
| Moda Center0
| 19–14
|- style="background:#cfc
| 34
| March 3
| Golden State
| 
| Anthony, Lillard (22)
| Enes Kanter (14)
| Damian Lillard (6)
| Moda Center0
| 20–14
|- style="background:#cfc
| 35
| March 4
| Sacramento
| 
| Damian Lillard (44)
| Enes Kanter (21)
| Damian Lillard (7)
| Moda Center0
| 21–14
|- align="center"
|colspan="9" bgcolor="#bbcaff"|All-Star Break
|- style="background:#cfc"
|- style="background:#fcc
| 36
| March 11
| Phoenix
| 
| Damian Lillard (30)
| Enes Kanter (11)
| Damian Lillard (8)
| Moda Center0
| 21–15
|- style="background:#cfc
| 37
| March 13
| @ Minnesota
| 
| Carmelo Anthony (26)
| Enes Kanter (11)
| Damian Lillard (10)
| Target Center0
| 22–15
|- style="background:#fcc
| 38
| March 14
| @ Minnesota
| 
| Damian Lillard (38)
| Enes Kanter (11)
| Anthony, Covington (5)
| Target Center0
| 22–16
|- style="background:#cfc
| 39
| March 16
| New Orleans
| 
| Damian Lillard (50)
| Damian Lillard (6)
| Damian Lillard (10)
| Moda Center0
| 23–16
|- style="background:#cfc
| 40
| March 18
| New Orleans
| 
| Damian Lillard (36)
| Enes Kanter (13)
| Anthony, McCollum, Trent (2)
| Moda Center0
| 24–16
|- style="background:#cfc
| 41
| March 19
| Dallas
| 
| CJ McCollum (32)
| Enes Kanter (9)
| Damian Lillard (6)
| Moda Center0
| 25–16
|- style="background:#fcc
| 42
| March 21
| Dallas
| 
| Damian Lillard (19)
| Covington, Kanter (6)
| Damian Lillard (4)
| Moda Center0
| 25–17
|- style="background:#fcc
| 43
| March 23
| Brooklyn
| 
| Damian Lillard (22)
| Enes Kanter (19)
| Damian Lillard (9)
| Moda Center0
| 25–18
|- style="background:#cfc
| 44
| March 25
| @ Miami
| 
| CJ McCollum (35)
| Enes Kanter (16)
| Damian Lillard (9)
| American Airlines Arena2,000
| 26–18
|- style="background:#cfc
| 45
| March 26
| @ Orlando
| 
| McCollum, Powell (22)
| Enes Kanter (15)
| CJ McCollum (7)
| Amway Center3,827
| 27–18
|- style="background:#cfc
| 46
| March 28
| @ Toronto
| 
| CJ McCollum (23)
| Robert Covington (12)
| Damian Lillard (11)
| Amalie Arena2,021
| 28–18
|- style="background:#cfc
| 47
| March 31
| @ Detroit
| 
| Damian Lillard (33)
| Enes Kanter (8)
| Damian Lillard (10)
| Little Caesars Arena0
| 29–18

|- style="background:#fcc
| 48
| April 2
| Milwaukee
| 
| Damian Lillard (32)
| Jusuf Nurkic (11)
| CJ McCollum (7)
| Moda Center0
| 29–19
|- style="background:#cfc
| 49
| April 3
| Oklahoma City
| 
| CJ McCollum (20)
| Enes Kanter (17)
| Damian Lillard (6)
| Moda Center0
| 30–19
|- style="background:#fcc
| 50
| April 6
| @ L. A. Clippers
| 
| Norman Powell (32)
| Enes Kanter (15)
| Lillard, McCollum (6) 
| Staples Center0
| 30–20
|- style="background:#fcc
| 51
| April 8
| @ Utah
| 
| Damian Lillard (23)
| Enes Kanter (7)
| Damian Lillard (6)
| Vivint Arena5,546
| 30–21
|- style="background:#cfc
| 52
| April 10
| Detroit
| 
| Damian Lillard (27)
| Enes Kanter (30)
| Damian Lillard (10)
| Moda Center0
| 31–21
|- style="background:#fcc
| 53
| April 11
| Miami
| 
| McCollum, Powell (17)
| Jusuf Nurkic (9)
| Covington, Nurkic (4)
| Moda Center0
| 31–22
|- style="background:#fcc
| 54
| April 13
| Boston
| 
| Damian Lillard (28)
| Enes Kanter (10)
| Damian Lillard (10)
| Moda Center0
| 31–23
|- style="background:#cfc
| 55
| April 16
| @ San Antonio
| 
| CJ McCollum (29)
| Enes Kanter (13)
| CJ McCollum (6)
| AT&T Center4,303
| 32–23
|- style="background:#fcc
| 56
| April 18
| @ Charlotte
| 
| Carmelo Anthony (24)
| Covington, Kanter (7)
| CJ McCollum (6)
| Spectrum Center3,880
| 32–24
|- style="background:#fcc
| 57
| April 20
| L. A. Clippers
| 
| CJ McCollum (28)
| Nassir Little (10)
| CJ McCollum (5)
| Moda Center0
| 32–25
|- style="background:#fcc
| 58
| April 21
| Denver
| 
| Damian Lillard (22)
| CJ McCollum (9)
| Jusuf Nurkic (6)
| Moda Center0
| 32–26
|- style="background:#fcc
| 59
| April 23
| Memphis
| 
| Damian Lillard (26)
| Jusuf Nurkic (17)
| CJ McCollum (7)
| Moda Center0
| 32–27
|- style="background:#fcc
| 60
| April 25
| Memphis
| 
| CJ McCollum (27)
| Jusuf Nurkic (19)
| Lillard, Nurkic (5)
| Moda Center0
| 32–28
|- style="background:#cfc
| 61
| April 27
| @ Indiana
| 
| Anfernee Simons (27)
| Enes Kanter (14)
| Damian Lillard (6)
| Bankers Life Fieldhouse0
| 33–28
|- style="background:#cfc
| 62
| April 28
| @ Memphis
| 
| CJ McCollum (26)
| Jusuf Nurkic (9)
| CJ McCollum (6)
| FedEx Forum3,427
| 34–28
|- style="background:#cfc
| 63
| April 30
| @ Brooklyn
| 
| Damian Lillard (32)
| Jusuf Nurkic (11)
| Damian Lillard (9)
| Barclays Center1,773
| 35–28

|- style="background:#cfc
| 64
| May 2
| @ Boston
| 
| CJ McCollum (33)
| Jusuf Nurkic (11)
| Damian Lillard (13)
| TD Garden2,298
| 36–28
|- style="background:#fcc
| 65
| May 3
| @ Atlanta
| 
| Damian Lillard (33)
| Jusuf Nurkic (10)
| Lillard, McCollum (8)
| State Farm Arena3,091
| 36–29
|- style="background:#cfc
| 66
| May 5
| @ Cleveland
| 
| Damian Lillard (32)
| Enes Kanter (13)
| Damian Lillard (9)
| Rocket Mortgage FieldHouse4,148
| 37–29
|- style="background:#cfc
| 67
| May 7
| L. A. Lakers
| 
| Damian Lillard (38)
| Jusuf Nurkic (13)
| Damian Lillard (7)
| Moda Center1,939
| 38–29
|- style="background:#cfc
| 68
| May 8
| San Antonio
| 
| Damian Lillard (30)
| Robert Covington (11)
| Damian Lillard (8)
| Moda Center1,939
| 39–29
|- style="background:#cfc
| 69
| May 10
| Houston
| 
| Damian Lillard (34)
| Enes Kanter (10)
| CJ McCollum (7)
| Moda Center1,939
| 40–29
|- style="background:#cfc
| 70
| May 12
| @ Utah
| 
| Damian Lillard (30)
| Jusuf Nurkic (15)
| Lillard, Nurkic (6)
| Vivint Arena6,506
| 41–29
|- style="background:#fcc
| 71
| May 13
| @ Phoenix
| 
| Damian Lillard (41)
| Kanter, Nurkic (8)
| CJ McCollum (6)
| Phoenix Suns Arena8,359
| 41–30
|- style="background:#cfc
| 72
| May 16
| Denver
| 
| CJ McCollum (24)
| Enes Kanter (15)
| Damian Lillard (10)
| Moda Center1,939
| 42–30

Playoffs 

|- style="background:#cfc;"
| 1
| May 22
| @ Denver
| 
| Damian Lillard (34)
| Jusuf Nurkić (12)
| Damian Lillard (13)
| Ball Arena7,732
| 1–0
|- style="background:#fcc;"
| 2
| May 24
| @ Denver
| 
| Damian Lillard (42)
| Jusuf Nurkić (13)
| Damian Lillard (10)
| Ball Arena7,727
| 1–1
|- style="background:#fcc;"
| 3
| May 27
| Denver
| 
| Damian Lillard (37)
| Jusuf Nurkić (13)
| Jusuf Nurkić (6)
| Moda Center8,050
| 1–2
|- style="background:#cfc;"
| 4
| May 29
| Denver
| 
| Norman Powell (29)
| Robert Covington (9)
| Damian Lillard (10)
| Moda Center8,050
| 2–2
|- style="background:#fcc;"
| 5
| June 1
| @ Denver
| 
| Damian Lillard (55)
| Covington, Nurkić (11)
| Damian Lillard (10)
| Ball Arena10,463
| 2–3
|- style="background:#fcc;"
| 6
| June 3
| Denver
| 
| Damian Lillard (28)
| Robert Covington (10)
| Damian Lillard (13)
| Moda Center10,022
| 2–4

Transactions

Trades

Free agency

Re-signed

Additions

Subtractions

References

Portland Trail Blazers seasons
Portland Trail Blazers
Portland Trail Blazers
Portland Trail Blazers
Portland
Portland